Ashmita Khadka is a Nepalese Taekwondo player. She was born in Kathmandu. She has won a bronze medal at the 2019 South Asian Games 2019. Ashmita has represented Nepal at the 2018 Asian Games held in Indonesia. She has won numerous International tournaments including Malaysian Open G1 where she won a bronze medal. She has also won silver medal at the World University Championship held in Korea.

Ashmita won the Nepal National and International Players Association (NNIPA) player of the year award for Taekwondo in 2018. She represented Nepal at 2017 Universiade and 2019 Universiade.

References

Year of birth missing (living people)
Living people
Sportspeople from Kathmandu
Nepalese taekwondo practitioners
Taekwondo practitioners at the 2018 Asian Games
Competitors at the 2017 Summer Universiade
Competitors at the 2019 Summer Universiade
21st-century Nepalese people